is a remix album by Japanese singer/songwriter Chisato Moritaka, released on December 10, 1989. The album includes two new tracks: "Uwasa" and "Michi", plus songs re-recorded by Moritaka and remixed by Hideo Saitō. A limited edition release included a 60-page photo book.

The album peaked at No. 2 on Oricon's albums chart and sold over 313,000 copies. It was also Moritaka's first album to be certified Platinum by the RIAJ.

Track listing 
All music is composed and arranged by Hideo Saitō, except where indicated.

Personnel 
 Chisato Moritaka – vocals
 Hideo Saitō – all instruments, programming, backing vocals
 Manaho Saitō – backing vocals (8, 12)

Charts

Certification

References

External links 
 
 
 

1989 remix albums
Chisato Moritaka compilation albums
Japanese-language remix albums
Warner Music Japan compilation albums